Service-oriented may refer to:

 Service-orientation, in business computing
 Service-oriented architecture (SOA), related to the above meaning
 Service-oriented development of applications (SODA), a way of producing service-oriented architecture applications
 Service-oriented device architecture (SODA), to enable devices to be connected to a service-oriented architecture (SOA)
 Service-oriented distributed applications, an architecture that allows some services to be run on the client and some on the server
 Service-oriented infrastructure (SOI), a system for describing information technology infrastructure as a service
 Service-oriented modeling, a discipline of modeling business and software systems
 Service-oriented provisioning (SOP), a technology concept pertaining to Wireless Internet service provider (WISP) and ISP space
 Service-oriented software engineering (SOSE), a software engineering methodology focused on the composition of reusable components
 Service-oriented transformation, the successor to classic business transformation initiatives
 Service-oriented (sexuality), in human sexuality